The following is a list of Howard Bison football seasons for the football team that has represented Howard University in NCAA competition.

Results

References

 
Howard Bison
Howard Bison football seasons